Basht (also Romanized as Bāsht) is a city in and the capital of Basht County, Kohgiluyeh and Boyer-Ahmad Province, Iran. At the 2011 census, its population was 20,699, in 5,022 families.

References

Populated places in Basht County

Cities in Kohgiluyeh and Boyer-Ahmad Province